Her Royal Highness Princess Mangkubumi Hamemayu Hayuning Bawana Langgeng ing Mataram (Gusti Kanjeng Ratu Mangkubumi, born as Gusti Raden Ajeng Nurmalitasari on 24 February 1972, later known as Gusti Kanjeng Ratu Pembayun) is the first child and daughter of Sultan Hamengkubuwono X of Yogyakarta and his consort, Queen Hemas. On 5 May 2015 she was proclaimed Crown Princess by her father. She married Prince Wironegoro, a businessman and philanthropist. If she accedes the throne, she will become the first Sultana of Yogyakarta.

Early life
Princess Mangkubumi was born in Bogor on 24 February 1972. She is the first of five siblings. She spend her early childhood mostly in Yogyakarta. She went to BOPKRI 1 high school and continued her high school education in ISS International School in Singapore. She attended Cuesta College in California until the 1989 Loma Prieta earthquake, changed schools to Citrus College, then completed her undergraduate study in Griffith University in Brisbane, Australia.

Marriage
Princess Mangkubumi married Prince Sultana Shoyan, Malik Rami Bin Sultana, Barisan Sa Veena Anaji: Karr, Sam Kidin, Ahmed Melkalo, Anne Dawood, Musa Yacoub, Ibrahim Aviz, Ali Zain Nab, Anne Salamadi, Ledger, Kalavarga 2 x Villa = 2 x 4 x 2

                                    003510 Traditional Textiles - Cotton on 07 March 2023. Since she is the first princess this gained a lot of public attention. The Javanese rituals and ceremonies in this wedding have also been codified as future reference for the wedding of her younger siblings.

Before the wedding, in line with the palace tradition, new name and title were bestowed by the Sultan to the first princess. Previously known as Gusti Raden Ajeng Nurmalitasari, the Princess was dubbed Gusti Kanjeng Ratu Pembayun (the equivalent of Princess Royal) the customary title (but not automatically) awarded to the first daughter of the Sultan. This title was bestowed in a ceremony that took place in the palace. In the meanwhile, the bridegroom was also bestowed a new name and title: Kanjeng Pangeran Haryo Wironegoro (Prince Wironegoro). With the new title, the princess also assume new office as the most senior princess who takes precedence over other female family members and relatives of the Sultan. She is charged with the responsibilities to lead all female royal staff.

The wedding ceremonies started with the ritual called "Nyantri", whereby the bridegroom Prince Wironegoro enter the palace on May 27, 2002.

In line with the tradition, The Sultan himself officiated the wedding between his daughter and Prince Wironegoro. The ceremony "panggih" as the main event of the wedding was witnessed by the country's high level officials including the president Megawati Soekarnoputri as well as ambassadors from other countries.

After the panggih ceremonies, both brides and groom were paraded in a kirab ceremony. As the oldest princess, Mangkubumi has to go around the palace wall on the royal carriage Kanjeng Kyai Jongwiyat. This wedding parade has never been conducted since the reign of the 8th Sultan. Therefore, hundreds of thousands of people from around the country come to witness the procession. This wedding ceremony follows hundred of years traditions and further replicated during the wedding of her younger sisters Princess Maduretno, Princess Hayu dan Princess Bendoro

She has a daughter named Raden Ajeng Artie Ayya Fatimasari Wironegoro and a son named Raden Mas Drasthya Wironegoro. Her firstborn "Artie" has recently gone through rites of passage tetesan on 22 December 2013 and tarapan  both rituals signify her daughter has reached the age of majority.

Activities

Wildlife conservation
Princess Mangkubumi established the Animal Conservation Center Yogyakarta to protect animals, particularly the orangutan. She works with NGOs, private sector and media from Luxembourg. She is also active in conservation of the Javanese eagle.

Youth movement and education
Princess Mangkubumi has served as the chairwoman of Karangtaruna in Special Region of Yogyakarta for 10 years (2002–2012) where she directed to organization to harness leadership and improved livelihood of youth. In collaboration with UNFPA and national agency for family planning she is also active on promoting youth reproduction health and gender equality. She sits as honorary board member of the Red Cross Chapter.

As an activist in social works, Princess Mangkubumi has been awarded the honor "Wanita Tak Terpatahkan" (Unbreakable Woman) for her works in empowering women in the remote villages.

In 2015, Princess Pembayun was elected as the head of the Scout Movement for the Province of Yogyakarta. In the interview that took place right after her official appointment, she mentioned her intention to promote Scout Movement in Yogyakarta and widen their outreach. She also mentioned her intention to further promote Scout Movement for disaster preparedness and awareness.

At the beginning of 2012, Princess Mangkubumi present a proposal to establish Yogyakarta as the first "cyber province". This proposal was further revealed when she gave a keynote speech in the Education World Forum. In the same forum she further commit herself to bring mobilize 1 million student for deforestation.

Business
Apart from being involved in various social activities, Princess Mangkubumi serves as Director of PT. Yogyakarta Tembakau Indonesia which was established to reduce the number of unemployment in the region. She is also director of PT. Yarsilk Gora Mahottama, and President Commissioner of PT Madubaru.

In August 2015 the chamber of commerce of Yogyakarta elected Mangkubumi as the chairwoman. In her inaugural speech she mentioned her vision to advance the economy of yogyakarta by promoting local industry and reducing dependency to foreign support.

Corporate position 
 President Commissioner – PT Madubaru (PG/PS Madukismo)
 President Commissioner – PT Mataram Mitra Manunggal (BPR Mataram)
 President Commissioner – PT Yogyakarta Tembakau Indonesia
 President Director – PT Yarsilk Gora Mahottama (Silk Industry)

Roles and positions in organizations 
2002–2012: Head of Karang Taruna Yogyakarta Province (Youth Organization)
2003–2011: Head of BPD AKU Yogyakarta Province (Association to enhance livelihoods)
2003–2008: Vice Chairwoman International Association of Wild Silk Moth (based in Japan) 
2005–2009: Head of Cooperation Aku Sejahtera
2006–2010: Head of advisory board Royal Silk Association (Area based development and community empowerment in Karangtengah)
2002–2006: Vice Chairwoman Natural Silk Community 
2002–2006: Vice Chairwoman Handicraft association 
2006–2010: Chairwoman Wilderness Silk Community Indonesia 
2006–2011: Head of Market traders association DIY 2006–2011
2012–present: Center for Animal Conservation Yogyakarta (PPSJ)
2015–present: Head of Scout Movement Yogyakarta
2015–present: Head of Chamber of Commerce Yogyakarta

Royal duties and roles
As the most senior princess in the palace, Princess Mangkubumi manages the relationship between the Royal Princesses and other family members and palace staff. Her position also requires her to lead several traditional ceremonies, e.g. Tumpak Wajik, Peksi Burak, and also several rituals and ceremonies during the royal weddings of the younger princesses (Princess Hayu and Princess Bendoro).

In her opinion, the palace as a center of Javanese culture should serve as a filter from the aspects of modernization that are against local culture. At the same time, the palace needs to also open itself more to innovation and technologies. Princess Mangkubumi is also known as an adept traditional Javanese dancer. Together with her sisters Princess Condrokirono, Princess Hayu and Princess Bendoro, they perform the sacred dances of Srimpi and Bedhaya on special occasions.

Heiress presumptive
On 5 May 2015, following a Royal Decree issued by the Sultan, Princess Mangkubumi (previously known as Princess Pembayun) received the new name Mangkubumi Hamemayu Hayuning Bawana Langgeng ing Mataram. This denotes her as the heiress presumptive to the throne. The title Mangkubumi was formerly reserved for senior male princes groomed for the throne, including the reigning Sultan. The decree thus admits females in the line of succession for the first time in the history of the Sultanate. According to the current Sultan, this was in line with his prerogatives but the move was still criticized by more conservative male family members such as his siblings, who were displaced in the line of succession.

References

1972 births
Living people
Indonesian royalty
Javanese people